William Henry John Sneazwell (3 April 1906 – 14 December 1967) was  a former Australian rules footballer who played for the Collingwood Football Club in the Victorian Football League (VFL).

Family
The son of Henry Bow Sneazwell (1882-1941), and Mary Frances Sneazwell (1876-1970), née O'Connor, William Henry John Sneazwell was born at South Melbourne, Victoria on 3 April 1906.

He married Eileen Mary Keenan (1908-1932) in 1928.

He married Veronica Hanlon (1915-2001) on 22 March 1941; their son, Anthony Howard "Tony" Sneazwell (1942-), a former champion Australian high jumper, competed at the 1964 and 1968 Summer Olympics.

Death
He died, of lymphoma, at St Vincent's Hospital, in Fitzroy on 14 December 1967.

Notes

References
 
 Sharland, W.S., "Sneazwell, of Tornbury pleases Collingwood folk", The Sporting Globe, (Saturday, 3 September 1927), p.6
 Second World War Nominal Roll: Signalman William Henry Sneazwell, Department of Veterans' Affairs

External links 

 		
 
 Bill Sneazwell's profile at Collingwood Forever

1906 births
1967 deaths
Australian rules footballers from Victoria (Australia)
Collingwood Football Club players